Tange may refer to:

People:
Arthur Tange (1914–2001), Australian senior public servant
Jun Watanabe Tange or Watanabe Jun (born 1954), Japanese architect, former professor at Chubu University
Kenzo Tange (1913–2005), Japanese architect, winner of the 1987 Pritzker Prize for architecture
Klaus Tange (born 1962), Danish actor in theatre, film, and television
Sakura Tange (born 1973), Japanese idol, voice actress and singer
Tange Sazen, fictional swordsman from Japanese literature and cinema

Geography:
Tange Bolaghi or Tangeh Bolaghi, archaeologically significant valley in Iran with 130 ancient settlements
Tange Promontory, ice-covered peninsula just west of Casey Bay on the coast of Enderby Land

Other:
Tange International Co., manufacturer of bicycle frame tubing

See also
Dange (disambiguation)
Tang (disambiguation)
Tanga (disambiguation)
Tangi (disambiguation)
Tangle (disambiguation)
Tango (disambiguation)
Tonge (disambiguation)